Boileau can refer to:

Persons
Alexander Boileau, an early surveyor, census administrator and agent of the East India Company
Arthur Boileau (born 1957), Canadian Olympic distance runner
Boileau baronets, a title in the Baronetage of Tacolneston Hall in the County of Norfolk, United Kingdom
Boileau-Narcejac, pen name of Pierre Boileau and Pierre Ayraud, also known as Thomas Narcejac, French writers of police stories
Charles Boileau, 17th century French ecclesiastic and preacher, member of the Académie française
Emmanuel Boileau de Castelnau (1857–1923), French mountain climber
George Theodore Boileau, American Roman Catholic bishop
Gilles Boileau, 17th century member of the Académie française
Jacques Boileau, 17th century French clergyman
John Theophilus Boileau (1805–1886), British army engineer
Nicolas Boileau-Despréaux (1636–1711), 17th century French writer

Places
Boileau, Quebec, Canada

Other
Boileau premetro station, a premetro station in the Etterbeek municipality of Brussels